KBXR 102.3 FM (often referred to simply as BXR) is a local radio station located on Old Highway 63 in Columbia, Missouri. It airs an Adult Album Alternative format with a mixture of alternative rock, classic rock, and more.

Features
102-3 BXR interviews bands or singers playing in the city's various locations. These interviews are conducted "Live In Studio X." Past Studio X guests include Joe Strummer of The Clash, Big Head Todd and the Monsters, Dave Matthews, Wilco, and Sheryl Crow (who attended the University of Missouri in Columbia). In 2005, KBXR released a CD compilation of songs recorded at the station, called  Live from Studio X. Proceeds from the CD sales went to the Central Missouri Humane Society. The station released a second CD in December 2008 called Live from Studio X, Volume 2. The proceeds from this project go to Boys and Girls Town of Missouri.

Annually, during Thanksgiving and about a week after, BXR has a "B to X" special event where the station airs its entire song library alphabetically with no repeats starting with song titles that begin with the letter B and ending with song titles that begin with the letter X. Many lesser-known songs by various popular bands and singers are aired right along with more popular chart-toppers. Also, this event allows various versions of the same song that have been remixed or remade to be heard back-to-back since the songs are spelled the same alphabetically.

History
The station began broadcasting on November 11, 1994. It held the call sign KOQL and aired an oldies format. In September 1997, the station swapped formats and call signs with 106.1 KBXR, and it adopted its present AAA format. Its Adult Album Alternative (AAA) format originated on 106.1 FM on October 15, 1993. The first song was played at 1:06 pm and was R.E.M.'s "It's The End Of The World As We Know It".

102.3 BXR has had a long list of notable entertainers play for the annual birthday party at The Blue Note.

References

External links
102.3 BXR Online

BXR
Adult album alternative radio stations in the United States
Radio stations established in 1994
1994 establishments in Missouri
Cumulus Media radio stations